"Bewitched (Bothered and Bewildered)" is a show tune and popular song from the 1940 Rodgers and Hart musical Pal Joey.  It is part of the Great American Songbook.  The song was introduced by Vivienne Segal on December 25, 1940, in the Broadway production during Act I, Scene 6, and again in Act II, Scene 4, as a reprise. Segal also sang the song on both the 1950 hit record and in the 1952 Broadway revival. It was performed by Carol Bruce in the 1954 London production.

Chart versions
Doris Day with The Mellomen and orchestra conducted by John Rarig
Columbia 38698 (matrix: HCO 3765-1N)
Recorded: May 13, 1949
Peak Billboard chart position: No. 9
Bill Snyder
 Billboard year-end top 30 singles of 1950 No. 24
Gordon Jenkins and orchestra with vocal chorus by Bonnie Lou Williams
Decca 24983
Peak Billboard chart position: No. 6
 Billboard year-end top 30 singles of 1950 No. 26
Jan August orchestra and The Harmonicats
Mercury 5399
Peak Billboard chart position: No. 17
Larry Green
RCA Victor 20-3726
Peak Billboard chart position: No. 15
Mel Tormé & Dave Lambert Singers with orchestra directed by Pete Rugolo
Capitol 1000 (matrix: 5719-Y)
Recorded: April 3, 1950
Peak Billboard radio popularity chart position: No. 10

Rod Stewart and Cher version

In 2003 the song was released as a duet by Rod Stewart and Cher, as single from his second pop standards album, As Time Goes By: the Great American Songbook 2. It was released in 2003 by J Records. The song was called a 'delicious duet' in a review by Billboard Magazine. The cover also became a moderate hit on the Adult Contemporary chart in the United States, peaking at number 17.

Weekly charts

References in popular culture
It is mentioned several times in the TV series Dynasty as being the favorite song of Blake (John Forsythe) and Alexis (Joan Collins).  They dance to it in Season Seven Episode 28. "Shadow Play", which originally aired on May 6, 1987.

A reference to the song is also made in the title of one episode of Bewitched (Season 8 Episode 5), "Bewitched, Bothered and Baldoni".

It is sung and performed on piano by Hannah's parents during a Thanksgiving gathering at home in the 1986 film Hannah and Her Sisters.

The song appeared in the second episode of the first season of television series The Crown titled "Hyde Park Corner", sung by King George VI (Jared Harris) and Princess Margaret (Vanessa Kirby).

References

External links
 Lyrics to the full (original) version

1940 songs
Pop standards
Songs with music by Richard Rodgers
Songs with lyrics by Lorenz Hart
Songs from Pal Joey (musical)
Doris Day songs
Ella Fitzgerald songs
Song recordings produced by Richard Perry
Cher songs
2003 singles
Barbra Streisand songs
Ronnie Milsap songs
Songs from Pal Joey (film)